Joe Neil Womack (born December 10, 1936) is a former American football Halfback who played one season with the Pittsburgh Steelers of the National Football League (NFL). He played college football at Los Angeles State College—now known as California State University, Los Angeles. Womack was drafted by the Steelers in the 150th pick in the 13th round of the 1960 NFL draft.

References

1936 births
Living people
American football halfbacks
Cal State Los Angeles Diablos football players
Pittsburgh Steelers players
Sportspeople from Fort Worth, Texas
Sportspeople from San Bernardino, California
Players of American football from California